Middleborough Center is a census-designated place (CDP) in the town of Middleborough in Plymouth County, Massachusetts, United States. The population was 7,319 at the 2010 census.

Geography
Middleborough Center is located at  (41.894045, -70.919148).

According to the United States Census Bureau, the CDP has a total area of 10.5 km (4.1 mi2), all land.

Demographics

At the 2000 census there were 6,913 people in 2,614 households, including 1,649 families, in the CDP. The population density was 657.4/km (1,700.7/mi2). There were 2,759 housing units at an average density of 262.4/km (678.8/mi2).  The racial makeup of the CDP was 95.01% White, 1.71% African American, 0.30% Native American, 0.64% Asian, 0.03% Pacific Islander, 0.65% from other races, and 1.66% from two or more races. Hispanic or Latino of any race were 1.01%.

Of the 2,614 households 35.5% had children under the age of 18 living with them, 41.9% were married couples living together, 15.8% had a female householder with no husband present, and 36.9% were non-families. 29.3% of households were one person and 11.5% were one person aged 65 or older. The average household size was 2.52 and the average family size was 3.15.

The age distribution was 27.0% under the age of 18, 8.1% from 18 to 24, 33.6% from 25 to 44, 18.0% from 45 to 64, and 13.3% 65 or older. The median age was 34 years. For every 100 females, there were 90.8 males. For every 100 females age 18 and over, there were 87.1 males.

The median household income was $45,906 and the median family income  was $52,340. Males had a median income of $38,422 versus $28,194 for females. The per capita income for the CDP was $18,920. About 6.3% of families and 8.6% of the population were below the poverty line, including 11.4% of those under age 18 and 6.8% of those age 65 or over.

References

Middleborough, Massachusetts
Census-designated places in Plymouth County, Massachusetts
Census-designated places in Massachusetts